PF-03550096 is a drug that acts as a potent agonist for the CB2 cannabinoid receptor, with good selectivity over CB1 having Ki values of 7nM at CB2 and 1500nM at CB1. It was originally developed by Pfizer in 2008 as a medication for irritable bowel syndrome, but has only progressed to animal studies.

See also 
 AB-FUBINACA
 AB-PINACA

References 

Cannabinoids